The Senior men's race at the 2013 IAAF World Cross Country Championships was held at the Myślęcinek Park in Bydgoszcz, Poland, on March 24, 2013.  Reports of the event were given in the Herald and for the IAAF.

Complete results for individuals, and for teams were published.

Race results

Senior men's race (12 km)

Individual

Teams

Note: Athletes in parentheses did not score for the team result.

Participation
According to an unofficial count, 102 athletes from 30 countries participated in the Senior men's race.

 (6)
 (5)
 (1)
 (5)
 (1)
 (6)
 (2)
 (1)
 (5)
 (6)
 (4)
 (6)
 (1)
 (1)
 (1)
 (1)
 (1)
 (6)
 (3)
 (5)
 (4)
 (5)
 (4)
 (3)
 (1)
 (5)
 (1)
 (5)
 (6)
 (1)

See also
 2013 IAAF World Cross Country Championships – Junior men's race
 2013 IAAF World Cross Country Championships – Senior women's race
 2013 IAAF World Cross Country Championships – Junior women's race

References

Senior men's race at the World Athletics Cross Country Championships
IAAF World Cross Country Championships